Nicolas Coutelot (born 9 February 1977) is a retired professional male tennis player from France who reached a career-high singles ranking of World No. 87 in May 2002. He also failed a drugs test in 2004 and was suspended for two months (cannabis).

1996–2004
At the 2001 French Open Coutelot caused a major upset when he knocked out former World No. 1 Marcelo Rios in straight sets in the second round. But he lost a five set battle to Wayne Arthurs in the next round. In 2002 at the French Open Coutelot caused controversy when he claimed that Juan Carlos Ferrero had feigned injury, after he lost their second round encounter in the final set. However, Ferrero really was injured as he took a tumble whilst practicing against Tommy Robredo. At the US Open Coutelot made his best appearance by reaching the first round before losing in straight sets to defending champion and World No. 1 Lleyton Hewitt.

Coutelot again reached the third round of the French Open when he bundled out David Nalbandian in five sets, despite being two sets to love up, before winning the final set.

His career-high singles ranking was World No. 87.

Drugs suspension
Coutelot was suspended for two months in 2004 after he tested positive for cannabis when attempting to qualify for the Movistar Open.

ATP Challenger and ITF Futures finals

Singles: 19 (12–7)

Doubles: 3 (1–2)

Performance Timeline

Singles

References

External links
 
 

1977 births
Living people
French male tennis players
Sportspeople from Hauts-de-Seine
Sportspeople from Strasbourg
Doping cases in tennis
French sportspeople in doping cases